Kitsumkalum First Nation is a band government of the Tsimshian people based at Kitsumkalum, British Columbia in the Skeena River valley in the North Coast region near Terrace, British Columbia, Canada.  They are a member government of the Tsimshian First Nations treaty council.

Chief and Councillors

Demographics
The Kitsumkalum First Nation has 655 members.

Indian reserves

Indian reserves under the administration of the Kitsumkalum First Nation are:
Dalk-ka-gila-quoeux Indian Reserve No. 2, on the Kitsumkalum River, 6 miles NW of Terrace, 114.10 ha.  
Kitsumkaylum Indian Reserve No. 1, on the right bank of the Skeena River at the mouth of the Kitsumkalum River, 449.90 ha.  
Port Essington, on left bank of the Skeena River, at mouth of the Ecstall River 
Zimagord Indian Reserve No. 3, right bank of Skeena River at the mouth of the Zymagotitz River, at Remco CN station, 31. 0 ha.

References

Skeena Country
Tsimshian governments